Petermann may refer to:

Places

Antarctica
Petermann Island 
Petermann Ranges (Antarctica)

Australia
Petermann, Northern Territory, a locality  
Petermann Orogeny, a geological feature
Petermann Ranges (Australia)

Greenland
Petermann Glacier
Petermann Peak
Petermann Fjord

Elsewhere
Petermann (crater), a feature on the Moon
Kapp Petermann, a headland on the island of Spitsbergen

People
André Petermann (1922–2011), Swiss physicist
Andreas Petermann (born 1957), German cyclist
Anke Petermann, German radio journalist
August Heinrich Petermann (1822–1878), German cartographer
Daniel Petermann (born 1995), Canadian football player
Davide Petermann (born 1994), Italian football player
Erna Petermann (1912–?), Nazi concentration camp overseer
Felix Petermann (born 1984), German ice hockey player
Julius Heinrich Petermann 1801 –1876), German Orientalist
Lena Petermann (born 1994), German football player
Mary Locke Petermann (1908–1975), American  biochemist 
Philip Petermann (born 1991), Austrian football player
Viktor Petermann (1916–2001), German air force pilot
Xavier Petermann, Canadian actor

See also
Peterman (disambiguation)
 Peter Mann

German-language surnames
Surnames from given names